Meadows of Dan is an unincorporated community and census-designated place in Patrick County, Virginia, where the Blue Ridge Parkway (milepost 178) crosses U.S. Route 58 (Jeb Stuart Highway). It was first listed as a CDP in the 2020 census with a population of 72.

There are numerous country shops, classic houses, and restaurants in the community. It is located near the Patrick/Floyd county line about 20 miles east of Hillsville and about 14 miles northwest of Stuart, Virginia. The community's name is credited to one of its earliest English settlers, James Steptoe Langhorne,  and comes from the meadows that abound near the Dan River which flows through the area. The community's motto as posted on the welcoming sign is "A simpler place in time". Meadows of Dan is located along the Crooked Road, Virginia and the Crooked Road, Virginia's heritage music trail and in the Rocky Knob American Viticultural Area.

The community of Meadows of Dan hosts an annual Folk Fair, in cooperation with the Virginia Peach Festival.  Meadows of Dan was also a setting for the ministry of Reverend Bob Childress, whose life was chronicled in the book The Man Who Moved a Mountain.

The Cockram Mill and Mayberry Presbyterian Church are listed on the National Register of Historic Places. Meadows of Dan is located approximately one half hour north of Andy Griffith’s hometown of Mount Airy, North Carolina, the city which is widely believed to have inspired the fictitious Mayberry on the Andy Griffith Show.   It has been speculated that the name “Mayberry” may have come from either Mayberry Road or the Mayberry Presbyterian Church in Meadows of Dan.

Notable people

 Beatrice Farnham, artist and entrepreneur

References 

Unincorporated communities in Patrick County, Virginia
Unincorporated communities in Virginia
Census-designated places in Patrick County, Virginia
Census-designated places in Virginia